Akron is a town in Hale County, Alabama, United States. In 1906, the owner of a large plantation, Waller Evan Wedgworth, sold part of his land to developers, and a construction boom followed. The town was incorporated in March 1918. At the 2010 census the population was 356, down from 521 at the 2000 census. Akron has one site on the National Register of Historic Places, the Greek Revival cottage known as Tanglewood.

Geography

Demographics

Akron first appeared on the 1920 U.S. Census as an incorporated town. It was also the same name as its precinct/census division, which preceded it in reporting on the census since 1900 (See Akron Precinct below).

As of the 2010 Census Akron had a population of 356.  The racial and ethnic composition of the population was 86.5% black or African American, 13.2% white, 0.3% reporting two or more races and 0.3% Hispanic or Latino of any race.

As of the census of 2000, there were 521 people, 207 households, and 142 families residing in the town. The racial makeup of the town was 17.85% White, 81.00% Black or African American, and 1.15% from two or more races. 1.54% of the population were Hispanic or Latino of any race.

There were 207 households, out of which 36.7% had children under the age of 18 living with them, 34.8% were married couples living together, 30.9% had a female householder with no husband present, and 31.4% were non-families. 28.5% of all households were made up of individuals, and 14.5% had someone living alone who was 65 years of age or older. The average household size was 2.52 and the average family size was 3.15.

In the town, the population was spread out, with 29.4% under the age of 18, 9.8% from 18 to 24, 25.3% from 25 to 44, 20.9% from 45 to 64, and 14.6% who were 65 years of age or older. The median age was 32 years. For every 100 females, there were 81.5 males. For every 100 females age 18 and over, there were 68.8 males.

The median income for a household in the town was $19,875, and the median income for a family was $21,250. Males had a median income of $22,396 versus $18,500 for females. The per capita income for the town was $10,929. About 37.1% of families and 40.7% of the population were below the poverty line, including 60.2% of those under age 18 and 32.7% of those age 65 or over.

Akron Precinct (1900-50)/Stewart-Akron Division (1960-)

Akron first appeared as the 2nd precinct of Hale County in 1900. Prior to this, from 1870 to 1890, the beat/precinct was previously known as New Prospect. In 1910, the 2nd precinct name was changed to "Evans", but reverted to Akron in 1920 and continued to report until 1950. In 1960, as part of a general reorganization of counties, Akron precinct was consolidated with others, including precinct 16, Stewart's Station, and was renamed the Stewart-Akron Census Division. Although the town of Akron has a heavily Black population, as did the former Akron precinct when it reported racial demographics in 1930–40, and in the Stewart-Akron division from 1960 to 1980, in 1990 it reported only a Black plurality. In 2000, it transitioned to a White plurality and in 2010, became a White majority for the first time.

Notable person

Riggs Stephenson, (1898–1985) was a left fielder in Major League Baseball for Chicago Cubs, Nicknamed Old Hoss.

References

Towns in Hale County, Alabama
Towns in Alabama
Tuscaloosa, Alabama metropolitan area